The benzodioxans are a group of isomeric chemical compounds with the molecular formula C8H8O2.  There are three isomers of benzodioxan, as the second atom of oxygen of the dioxane can be in a second, third or fourth position: 1,2-dioxane, 1,3-dioxane and 1,4-dioxane, which respectively give 1,2-benzodioxan, 1,3-benzodioxan and 1,4-benzodioxan.

Derivatives
Some derivatives of 1,4-benzodioxan are used as pharmaceuticals including:

See also
1,4-Benzodioxine

References

External links